Hu Peng (born 26 January 1989 in Zhenjiang) is a Chinese powerlifter. He won the silver medal at the Men's 65 kg event at the 2016 Summer Paralympics, with 200 kilograms. In 2021, he did not perform a successful lift in the men's 72 kg event at the 2020 Summer Paralympics in Tokyo, Japan. A few months later, he won the silver medal in his event at the 2021 World Para Powerlifting Championships held in Tbilisi, Georgia.

References

External links
 

1989 births
Living people
Chinese powerlifters
Male powerlifters
Paralympic powerlifters of China
Paralympic silver medalists for China
Paralympic medalists in powerlifting
Powerlifters at the 2012 Summer Paralympics
Powerlifters at the 2016 Summer Paralympics
Powerlifters at the 2020 Summer Paralympics
Medalists at the 2012 Summer Paralympics
Medalists at the 2016 Summer Paralympics
People from Zhenjiang
21st-century Chinese people